Lymania (named for Lyman Bradford Smith, American botanist) is a genus in the plant family Bromeliaceae, subfamily Bromelioideae.  The genus was established in 1984 to "unite furrowed or winged species from Aechmea subgenera Lamprococcus, Araeococcus and Ronnbergia."

Lymania is a group of plants endemic to the Bahian coast of the Brazilian rainforest.  Modern DNA analysis has confirmed that Lymania is correctly classified as an independent genus containing two distinct clades.

Species
, Plants of the World Online accepted the following species:
 Lymania alvimii (L.B.Sm. & Read) Read
 Lymania azurea Leme 
 Lymania brachycaulis (Baker) L.F.Sousa
 Lymania corallina (Beer) Read
 Lymania globosa Leme 
 Lymania involucrata Leme & E.H.Souza
 Lymania languida Leme 
 Lymania marantoides (L.B.Sm.) Read
 Lymania smithii Read
 Lymania spiculata Leme & Forzza

References

External links

 FCBS Lymania Photos
 BSI Genera Gallery photos

 
Endemic flora of Brazil
Bromeliaceae genera